Premism is a 2010 Indian Kannada language romantic film directed by Ratnaja of Nenapirali fame. He has teamed up yet again with producer Ajay Gowda and music director Hamsalekha for the third time after Nenapirali and Honganasu in this film. The film mainly stars Chetan Chandra, Amulya and Varun with actor Sunil Raoh making a guest appearance.

The film released on 2 April 2010 across Karnataka and set high expectations for its storyline and picturization.

Plot
Nitin (Chetan) and Varun (Varun) are Police commissioner and head constable sons respectively. They are at loggerheads right from their childhood. Eventually, they both fall for the same girl Amulya, the sister of a traffic inspector. They express their love to her directly. But she travels back to her background happenings in Belgaum where she was in love with Prasanna (Sunil Raoh). How the twosome win over her despite her background forms the rest of the story.

Cast 
 Chetan Chandra as Nitin
 Amulya as Amulya D'Souza
 Varun as Varun
 Ananth Nag
 Avinash
 Chirdeep Hebbar as Takkadi
 Sathyajith
 Ganesh Rao
 Neenasam Ashwath
 Rekha V Kumar
 Sunil Raoh as Prasanna in a guest appearance
 Ashwin rao pallakki
 Surya kamath
 Shashikanth

Filming
Most of the filming took place at Mysore localities which was also the centered in director's earlier film Nenapirali. Some parts of the film was based in Belgaum as well. The filming also took place at the Chhattisgarh locations like Chitrakoot falls and Thiratghat falls making it the first regional film to have shot in the place. The film team left to the Macau islands at China for the song sequence and finished the same in couple of days time. The song "Premism Premism" is choreographed by 'Attakalari' Jayachandran who composed the dance involving 5 elements of earth - Sky, Fire, Wind, Water and Air.

Soundtrack 

All the songs are composed and written by Hamsalekha teaming up with the director and producer for the third time after Nenapirali and Honganasu. The songs were well received and remained at the top of the charts.

Reception

Critical response 

Shruti Indira Lakshminarayana of Rediff.com scored the film at 3.5 out of 5 stars and wrote "Hamsalekha's songs are catchy. A song which carries the tunes of Kurrak Kuknalikere... a hit number from Nenapirali, directed by Rathnaja, has been composed for the film. The song speaks of prominent areas in Mysore. Choreographers have used a mix of contemporary, tap, classical and folk styles to match the tunes. All in all, Premism is for those who like love stories". A critic from Bangalore Mirror wrote  "Premism is a film which concerns itself only with love without baggage of tearjerker sentiments. Ratnaja proceeds with a long winding narrative. But with a not-so-regular concept, he wins with the substance. There are also a couple of surprises. A sure hit for those who enjoy love stories". A critic from Deccan Herald wrote "The basic plot itself looks interesting and the fight between the sons of two close friends working in the police force has been well narrated. The first half is certainly engaging as it has many fun-filled moments. The best thing is that story moves forward with each sequence and proceedings really look interesting.“Premism” is certainly the best of Rathnaja’s works so far".

References 

2010 films
2010s Kannada-language films
Indian romance films
2010 romance films
Films scored by Hamsalekha